Western Train Station may refer to:
 Beijing West railway station
 Frankfurt western stations